The 2022 Genie Music Awards was held at the Namdong Gymnasium in Incheon, South Korea on November 8, 2022. Organized by Genie Music, the event returned after a year of hiatus and was the ceremony's first offline edition since 2019. Artists who released music between October 1, 2021, and October 5, 2022, are eligible to be nominated.

After the stampede incident at Itaewon, the event announced the cancellation of the red carpet and live broadcast. Instead, the show was recorded and rebroadcast on VOD platforms on November 18.

Judging criteria

Winners and nominees
Winners are highlighted in bold. The following nomination lists were made available on October 6.

Other awards 

 IdolPlus Global Popularity Award – BTS
 Best Record – (G)I-dle  – "Tomboy"
 Best Style - Ive
 Next Generation – DKZ
 Next Generation Global – PSYCHIC FEVER
 Next Wave Icon - Lightsum, TNX

References

South Korean music awards
2022 in South Korean music
2022 music awards
November 2022 events in South Korea